Adeta is a town in the Plateaux Region of Togo. Adeta is also a tourist town. Adeta is Ewe ethnic group in plateau region. Most of the population are farmers.

References 

Populated places in Plateaux Region, Togo